Prathama  UP Gramin Bank was created on 1 April 2019  by the amalgamation of two regional rural banks in Uttar Pradesh: 
 Prathama Bank 
 Sarva UP Gramin Bank
The creation of Prathama UP Gramin Bank took place under Sub-Section (1) of Section 23A of the Regional Rural Bank Act, 1976 (21 of 1976).

The bank has 938 branches around 19 districts of Uttar Pradesh; it will also have one branch in Haridwar District of Uttarakhand. The bank is sponsored by the Punjab National Bank.

See also

 List of banks in India
 List of regional rural banks in Uttar Pradesh

References

External links
 Official site

Regional rural banks of Uttar Pradesh
Companies based in Meerut
2019 establishments in Uttar Pradesh
Banks established in 2019
Indian companies established in 2019